Peter Cook (fl. 1390–1391), of Leominster, Herefordshire, was an English politician.

He was a Member (MP) of the Parliament of England for Leominster in January 1390 and 1391.

References

Year of birth missing
Year of death missing
English MPs January 1390
English MPs 1391
14th-century English politicians
People from Herefordshire